Hoeflea olei is a Gram-negative and rod-shaped bacteria from the genus of Hoeflea which has been isolated from water in Kerala in India. Hoeflea olei has the ability to degrade diesel oil.

References

Rhizobiaceae
Bacteria described in 2015